Scleropterini is a tribe of minute seed weevils in the family of beetles known as Curculionidae. There are at least eight genera in Scleropterini.

Genera
These eight genera belong to the tribe Scleropterini:
 Acallodes LeConte, 1876 i c g b
 Asperosoma Korotyaev, 1999 g b
 Homorosoma Frivaldszky, 1894 i c g b
 Prorutidosoma Korotyaev, 1999 g b
 Scleropteridius Otto, 1897 c g
 Scleropteroides Colonnelli, 1979 c g
 Scleropterus Schoenherr, 1825 c g
 Tapinotus Schoenherr, 1826 c g
Data sources: i = ITIS, c = Catalogue of Life, g = GBIF, b = Bugguide.net

References

Further reading

External links

 

Curculionidae